Lello is a surname. It may refer to:

Given name
Lello Arena (born 1953) Italian actor, comedian and television personality
Lello da Orvieto (1315–1340), Italian painter and mosaicist
Lello Voce (born 1957), Italian poet, writer and journalist

Surname
Christopher Lello (born 1971), English cricketer
Cyril Lello (1921–1997), English footballer
Henry Lello (fl. late 16th–early 17th century), English diplomat, warden of the Fleet Prison, and Keeper of the Palace of Westminster

See also
LELLO//ARNELL, a Norwegian/Swedish collaborative artistic duo
Livraria Lello, a Portuguese bookstore